Fate of the World is a 2011 global warming game developed and published by Red Redemption. It features several scenarios, based on actual scientific research, in which the player is put in charge of a fictional international organization managing social, technological and environmental policies. The goals of the scenarios range from improving living conditions in Africa, to preventing catastrophic climate change, to exacerbating it.  It is quickly followed by an expansion pack called Fate of the World: Tipping Point, released in late 2011. The climate prediction models for the game are the work of Myles Allen, the head of the Climate Dynamics group at the University of Oxford.

Gameplay 

Fate of the World is a turn-based game, with each turn representing five years.  The starting date is typically 2020, while the final date depends on the scenario.  In the core interface the player chooses policies to fund in each game turn, represented by "cards".  These need to be distributed and balanced between twelve world regions, and many, such as a transition to electric cars, take several turns to implement locking up funds for the duration.  The player also needs to manage public opinion with the risk of being banned from individual regions if public approval drops too low.  Each scenario specifies a set of win and lose conditions, such as the amount of warming in degrees Celsius, human development index, production, industrial or otherwise, and how many regions the player is active in.

Downloadable content
In Tipping Point, there are two downloadable content packs plus an extra pack which includes the soundtrack and designer notes of the game.

Migration DLC
In this content pack, in addition to the climate issues the player will also need to manage the climate refugees due to climate change.

Denial DLC
This scenario takes the issue of climate change out of the game and instead focuses on growth with limited and diminishing resources.

Reception

At launch, Fate of the World and Tipping Point received "mixed or average" reviews according to video game review aggregator Metacritic.  As of January 3, 2020, the game has a "mostly positive" rating on Steam, with a 78% positive rating over 313 reviews. The more positive reviewers thought the games were a brave attempt in depicting the complexity of environmental crises and the effects of global warming. However, negative aspects of the game and its expansion pack included unclear game mechanics, a brutal difficulty curve and a lack of feedback, which the game's community tried to address by creating an unofficial patch.

Sequel
Following the closure of Red Redemption, the rights to Fate of the World were acquired by another development studio, Soothsayer Games, which included some personnel who had worked on the original game. In 2015, they announced that they were working on an online multiplayer sequel, which was to be called Fate of the World Online. However, an unsuccessful Kickstarter campaign in 2017 meant that further development was unable to proceed. , Soothsayer Games were still actively seeking investment.

See also
 Climate Challenge

References

External links
 
 
 What’s the Fate of the World? by Graham Smith in PC Gamer UK.
 Some Impressions: The Fate Of The World review at Rock, Paper, Shotgun

2011 video games
Environmental education video games
MacOS games
Video games scored by Richard Jacques
Video games developed in the United Kingdom
Windows games